Sir Dermot MacDermot  (1906–1989), styled Prince of Coolavin, Chief of the Name, head of the MacDermot clan, and a descendant of the Kings of Moylurg.

MacDermot attended Stonyhurst College, and went on to Trinity College Dublin, where he was elected a Scholar.

Sir Dermot MacDermot had served as British Ambassador to Indonesia (1956–59) and Thailand (1961–65). He succeeded his brother as The MacDermot upon the latter's death in 1979. He wrote an account of the family titled "MacDermot of Moylurg: The Story of a Connacht Family". The book chronicles the affairs of the Kings of Moylurg and their neighbours over the course of six hundred years. It contains thirty-five family trees concerning MacDermots and their related families, and ten appendices.

MacDermot died before seeing the book in print, but it was published shortly after by his sons Niall (who succeeded him as Prince of Coolavin) Hugh and Connor.

See also

 Chiefs of the Name
 Kings of Moylurg

Notes

References

  or subsequent editions
 "Mac Dermot of Moylurg: The Story of a Connacht Family", Dermot MacDermot, 1996.
 The MacDermot Clan Association website

1906 births
1989 deaths
Ambassadors of the United Kingdom to Indonesia
Ambassadors of the United Kingdom to Thailand
Irish knights
Connachta
Irish chiefs of the name
MacDermot family
People educated at Stonyhurst College
Scholars of Trinity College Dublin